Willie Edward Jones (August 16, 1925 – October 18, 1983), nicknamed "Puddin' Head", was a professional baseball third baseman who played in Major League Baseball (MLB) for the Philadelphia Phillies (1947–1959), Cleveland Indians (1959), and Cincinnati Reds (1959–1961). He batted and threw right-handed.

In a 15-season career, Jones was a .258 hitter with 190 home runs and 812 runs batted in (RBI) in 1,691 games played. Defensively, he recorded a .963 fielding percentage.

Early life

Born in Dillon, South Carolina, Jones grew up in and listed Laurel Hill, North Carolina, as his home. Jones went on to serve his country in the United States Navy during World War II.

Major league baseball
Jones started his major league career with the Phillies in 1947. By 1949, he became the team's starting third baseman, and held that position until 1959. Jones was the top fielding third baseman in the National League (NL) during the 1950s. He led the league in fielding percentage five times, in putouts for seven years (also tying a record), and twice each in assists and double plays.

Jones' most productive season came as a member of the fabulous  "Whiz Kids" National League champion team, when he posted career-highs in home runs (25), RBI (88), runs (100), hits (163), and led the league in games played (157). In 1951, Jones hit 22 homers with 81 RBI and a career-high .285 batting average. He was selected for the All-Star Game in both seasons.

In 1959, Jones was part of successive trades between the Phillies, Cleveland Indians, and Cincinnati Reds. He finished his career with Cincinnati in 1961.

Jones was given his nickname from a popular 1930s song, "Woodenhead, Pudding' head  Jones".

Personal life
Jones was married to Carolyn, with whom he had three children, Eddie, Kathie, and Bradley. The marriage ended in divorce.

Death
On October 18, 1983, Jones died at the age of 58, of cancer in Cincinnati, Ohio — where he had lived after his playing days were over.

Highlights

 Twice All-Star (1950–51)
 Tied a major league record with four straight doubles in a game (April 28, 1949)
 His six career grand slams as a Phillie ties him for third place behind Mike Schmidt and Ryan Howard
His 2,045 career putouts are 10th-highest in major league history
Compiled a career 1.39 walk-to-strikeout ratio (755-to-541)

References

External links

Willie Jones at SABR (Baseball BioProject)

1925 births
1983 deaths
Baseball players from Cincinnati
Baseball players from South Carolina
Cincinnati Reds players
Cleveland Indians players
Deaths from cancer in Ohio
Major League Baseball third basemen
National League All-Stars
People from Dillon, South Carolina
Philadelphia Phillies players
Terre Haute Phillies players
Toronto Maple Leafs (International League) players
United States Navy personnel of World War II
Utica Blue Sox players